Rustem Vilevich Sabirkhuzin (born 4 January 1978) is a Kazakh modern pentathlete. He competed at the 2004 and 2012 Summer Olympics.  He finished in 10th position at the 2004 Games and in 21st at the 2012 Games.

References

External links
 

1978 births
Living people
Kazakhstani male modern pentathletes
Olympic modern pentathletes of Kazakhstan
Modern pentathletes at the 2004 Summer Olympics
Modern pentathletes at the 2012 Summer Olympics
Kazakhstani people of Russian descent
Russian expatriate sportspeople in Kazakhstan
Modern pentathletes at the 2014 Asian Games
World Modern Pentathlon Championships medalists
Asian Games competitors for Kazakhstan
Sportspeople from Ufa